"Hand In Hand" is the first single taken from beFour's second studio album "Hand In Hand," in Germany, Austria and Switzerland. As of December 22, 2007 the song had officially entered the German Singles Chart.

Formats and track listings
These are the formats and track listings of major single releases of "Hand In Hand."

 CD single
"Hand In Hand" (Radio Version) - 4:02
"Because It's Christmas" - 3:16
"Hand In Hand" (Karaoke Version) - 4:03
"Grußbotschaft" - 1:33

Digital Download
"Hand In Hand" - 3:59
"Because It's Christmas" - 3:16
"Hand In Hand" (Karaoke Version) - 4:03
"Grußbotschaft" - 1:33

Charts

2007 songs
BeFour songs
Christmas songs
Song recordings produced by Christian Geller
Songs written by Christian Geller